() or Route 32 is a national road in the Southern Region of Iceland. It runs from Route 30, through Þjórsárdalur valley to the intersection of Landvegur.

References

Roads in Iceland